Tomonaga is both a masculine Japanese given name and a Japanese surname.

Possible writings
Tomonaga can be written using different combinations of kanji characters. Here are some examples:

友永, "friend, eternity"
友長, "friend, long/leader"
知永, "know, eternity"
知長, "know, long/leader"
智永, "intellect, eternity"
智長, "intellect, long/leader"
共永, "together, eternity"
共長, "together, long/leader"
朋永, "companion, eternity"
朋長, "companion, extend"
朝永, "morning/dynasty, eternity"
朝長, "morning/dynasty, long/leader"

The name can also be written in hiragana ともなが or katakana トモナガ.

Notable people with the given name Tomonaga
, Japanese samurai

Notable people with the surname Tomonaga
, Gorōbyōe Tomonaga, Japanese priest in the Dominican Order of the Catholic Church
, Japanese modern pentathlete
, Japanese physicist

Japanese-language surnames
Japanese masculine given names